Alfons de Tous (died February 3, 1421) was president of the Generalitat of Catalonia 1396-1413, succeeding Miquel de Santjoan when the latter left Catalonia in 1396 to become a royal ambassador.

During the Western Schism, he aligned with the Antipope Benedict XIII and the revived line of Avignon popes, and continued that support until the Council of Constance, when Ferdinand I of Aragon withdrew his support for Avignon, at which point Alfons tried unsuccessfully to convince Benedict to voluntarily renounce his claim to the papacy.

Alfons began his ecclesiastical career as the rector of the church of Sant Mateu (Saint Matthew) in Tortosa. He next served the Benedict XIII as his ambassador to the Kingdom of Castile, and later became rector of the Church of Santa Maria del Pi in Barcelona, from which position he was appointed a deputy to the Corts of Barcelona, the Catalan parliament. On December 3, 1400, as president of the Corts of Barcelona, he purchased the original portion of what then became the Palau de la Generalitat de Catalunya for 38,500 sous. Alfons became the first president of the Generalitat of Catalonia to live there.

Subsequently to serving at Santa Maria del Pi, he became a canon of the Cathedral of Barcelona and, eventually, auditor of the Pia Almoina, the charitable fund of the cathedral. In 1408 King Martin of Aragon ("Martin the Humane") proposed him as bishop of Barcelona, but the Pope named Francisco de Blanes instead. Martin successfully exerted pressure to have him named bishop of Elne; in 1410, he was transferred to serve as bishop at Vic, where in 1417 he decreed that every parish must maintain a register of baptisms.

His activities in the role of ecclesiastical deputy to the Generalitat required that he take part in the parliamentary discussion of the succession after Martin's death in 1410. The new king Ferdinand I was from the House of Trastámara, which already ruled Castile, so his selection as king brought Aragon and Castile under the same dynastic house. Subsequently, Alfons presided over the Corts of Montblanc (1414). In both of these parliamentary assemblies as well as in the Corts of Sant Cugat-Tortosa (1419), he tried, with little success, to influence the new Trastámara king to continue the policies of the earlier line of Aragones monarchs.

References 

1421 deaths
15th-century Roman Catholic bishops in the Kingdom of Aragon
Bishops from Catalonia
Presidents of the Government of Catalonia
Year of birth unknown